WMJM (101.3 FM "Magic 101.3") is an urban adult contemporary station licensed to Jeffersontown, Kentucky serving the Louisville metropolitan area owned and operated by Alpha Media.  It currently carries the Steve Harvey Morning Show.  The station's studios are located in downtown Louisville and the transmitter site is atop Kaden Tower in east Louisville.

History
The station signed on in 1978 as WZZX with an album-oriented rock format. Unable to gain traction against market-leader 102.3 WLRS, WZZX switched to an adult contemporary music format as WJYL "The Joy of Louisville" in 1981. This station struggled against AC competitor 103.1 WRKA, so it began adding top 40 music to its playlist, becoming a hot AC outlet.  This move was successful, but short-lived. Following a sale, in 1984, WJYL adopted an urban contemporary format, becoming the first FM station in the Louisville market to target African-American listeners.  On January 5, 1989, the station began stunting with a loop of "Don't Let the Sun Catch You Crying" by Gerry and the Pacemakers. It would be accompanied with a return to a Soft AC format, becoming WLSY-FM ("Lite and Sunny") 

WLSY-FM was sold to the owners of mainstream urban contemporary WGZB in 1994 and became an urban adult contemporary-formatted sister station to the younger-skewing WGZB. This FM-FM duopoly combination covered the entire demographic reach of Louisville's African-American radio listenership, and hastened competitor WLOU's decline as the longtime urban/black/soul formatted station for the Louisville market (WLOU switched to an urban gospel format in 1996). The call sign was changed to WMJM in 1996; shortly afterward, the station moved from its original 101.7 frequency to 101.3 in a swap with WTHQ, allowing the WMJM signal to move farther west and avoid violating FCC antenna separation distance rules with the former WLRS on 102.3 MHz.

WMJM was acquired by Alpha Media in July 2014, as part of its purchase of Main Line Broadcasting.

References

External links
 Magic 101.3 Facebook
 

MJM
Urban adult contemporary radio stations in the United States
Alpha Media radio stations
Radio stations established in 1978
1978 establishments in Kentucky
Jeffersontown, Kentucky